Glucose-dependent insulinotropic polypeptide (GIP), also known as Gastric inhibitory polypeptide or gastric inhibitory peptide (also abbreviated as GIP), is an inhibiting hormone of the secretin family of hormones.  While it is a weak inhibitor of gastric acid secretion, its main role is to stimulate insulin secretion.

GIP, along with glucagon-like peptide-1 (GLP-1), belongs to a class of molecules referred to as incretins.

Synthesis and transport
GIP is derived from a 153-amino acid proprotein encoded by the GIP gene and circulates as a biologically active 42-amino acid peptide. It is synthesized by K cells, which are found in the mucosa of the duodenum and the jejunum of the gastrointestinal tract.

Like all endocrine hormones, it is transported by blood.

Gastric inhibitory polypeptide receptors are seven-transmembrane proteins found on beta-cells in the pancreas.

Functions 
It has traditionally been named gastrointestinal inhibitory peptide or gastric inhibitory peptide and was found to decrease the secretion of stomach acid  to protect the small intestine from acid damage, reduce the rate at which food is transferred through the stomach, and inhibit the GI motility and secretion of acid. However, this is incorrect, as it was discovered that these effects are achieved only with higher-than-normal physiological level, and that these results naturally occur in the body through a similar hormone, secretin.

It is now believed that the function of GIP is to induce insulin secretion, which is stimulated primarily by hyperosmolarity of glucose in the duodenum. After this discovery, some researchers prefer the new name of glucose-dependent insulinotropic peptide, while retaining the acronym "GIP."  The amount of insulin secreted is greater when glucose is administered orally than intravenously.

In addition to its role as an incretin, GIP is known to inhibit apoptosis of the pancreatic beta cells and to promote their proliferation. It also stimulates glucagon secretion and fat accumulation. GIP receptors are expressed in many organs and tissues including the central nervous system enabling GIP to influence hippocampal memory formation and regulation of appetite and satiety.

GIP recently appeared as a major player in bone remodeling. Researchers at Universities of Angers and Ulster evidenced that genetic ablation of the GIP receptor in mice resulted in profound alterations of bone microarchitecture through modification of the adipokine network. Furthermore, the deficiency in GIP receptors has also been associated in mice with a dramatic decrease in bone quality and a subsequent increase in fracture risk. However, the results obtained by these groups are far from conclusive because their animal models give discordant answers and  these works should be analysed very carefully.

Pathology
It has been found that type 2 diabetics are not responsive to GIP and have lower levels of GIP secretion after a meal when compared to non-diabetics. In research involving knockout mice, it was found that absence of the GIP receptors correlates with resistance to obesity.

References

External links 
 
 
 

Gastroenterology
Intestinal hormones
Diabetes